Hans Van Alphen (born 12 January 1982, in Turnhout) is a Belgian decathlete.

Van Alphen won the silver medal at the 2007 Summer Universiade and finished eleventh at the 2007 World Championships. In 2005, he became Belgian champion in the decathlon. He was the first Belgian decathlete to pass the 8000 points limit.

In 2008, Van Alphen was a competitor in the decathlon of the Beijing Olympics, but did not finish all the events due to injury.

He was just below the 8000-point mark at the 2010 Hypo-Meeting, where he came 13th, then he set a personal best score of 8072 points to finish fifth at the 2010 European Championships in Barcelona. Continuing in that vein, he set a best in the men's heptathlon at the 2011 European Athletics Indoor Championships, taking ninth place with a total of 5938 points. Turning to the outdoor circuit, he improved a number of event bests at the Hypo-Meeting (including the 100 metres, high jump and long jump) and ended the competition in eleventh place with 8045 points. At the 2011 TNT - Fortuna Meeting in Kladno he put together his best series of results: following a best of 66.21 m in the javelin, he moved up four places in the final 1500 metres to take the runner-up spot behind Leonel Suárez with a decathlon personal best of 8120 points.

In 2012 he won the decathlon at the Hypo-Meeting with a score of 8519. He ended fourth in the decathlon at the 2012 London Olympics. He ended the year with a win at the Decastar.

Personal bests 

Outdoor
 100 m - 10.96 (2012)
 400 m - 48.25 (2007)
 1500 m - 4:17.51 (2009)
 110 m hurdles - 14.55 (2012)
 High jump - 2.06 m (2012)
 Pole vault - 4.96 m (2012)
 Long jump - 7.64 m (2012)
 Shot put - 15.97 m (2014)
 Discus throw - 51.89 m (2012)
 Javelin throw - 67.59 m (2012)
 Decathlon - 8519 pts (May 26/27, 2012, Götzis)

Indoor
 60 m - 7.08 (2008)
 1000 m - 2:37.06 (2011)
 60 m hurdles - 8.19 (2006)
 High jump - 1.94 m (2011)
 Pole vault - 4.90 m (2011)
 Long jump - 7.34 m (2006)
 Shot put - 15.63 m (2010)
 Heptathlon - 5938 pts (2011)

Competition record

References

External links

Results at the 2008 Beijing Olympics

1982 births
Living people
Belgian decathletes
Olympic athletes of Belgium
Athletes (track and field) at the 2008 Summer Olympics
Athletes (track and field) at the 2012 Summer Olympics
Universiade medalists in athletics (track and field)
Sportspeople from Turnhout
Universiade silver medalists for Belgium
Medalists at the 2007 Summer Universiade